Ouimet Canyon is a large gorge in the municipality of Dorion, Thunder Bay District in northwestern Ontario, Canada, about  northeast of the city of Thunder Bay.

There is a walkway consisting of boardwalks and trails, which leads to viewing platforms overlooking the canyon. Visitors to the canyon should remain on the marked trails for their own safety. Also in the Ouimet Canyon area, there are rare alpine flowers that are considered especially beautiful and arctic plants normally found one thousand kilometres further north. The canyon is shown in the IMAX film North of Superior.

The canyon was named after the former railway station of Ouimet, today an unincorporated place and railway point, located nearby on the Canadian Pacific Railway line. The station itself was named after the Canadian Minister of Public Works from 1892 to 1896, Joseph-Aldric Ouimet.

Ouimet Canyon Provincial Park, a day-use park with no camping facilities, covers an area of  around the canyon.

Geology
The canyon is believed to have formed when a diabase sill dating from a billion years earlier was split open, either by the weight of advancing glaciers or the large volumes of water released during their retreat. Erosion by wind and rain continued the formation of the canyon. A large rock column known as the Indian Head can be seen from the northern viewing area.

Eagle Canyon

Near Ouimet Canyon is the privately owned and operated Eagle Canyon, which features on-site camping, two footbridges spanning the gorge and a zip line.

See also
 Agawa Canyon
 Achray, Ontario
 Barron River (Ontario)

Notes

External links

 

Landforms of Thunder Bay District
Canyons and gorges of Ontario
Protected areas of Thunder Bay District